Schofield Pass may refer to:

Schofield Pass (Colorado)
Schofield Pass (Nevada)
Schofield Pass (Wyoming)